Ivan Alexandrovich Savitskiy (born 6 March 1992 in Grozny) is a Russian former professional cyclist, who rode professionally between 2012 and 2017 for the  and  teams. On the track he represented the national team. He competed in the scratch event at the 2012 UCI Track Cycling World Championships. He was named in the start list for the 2016 Giro d'Italia.

Major results

2009
 UCI Juniors Track World Championships
1st  Team pursuit
3rd  Individual pursuit
 UEC European Junior Track Championships
1st  Team pursuit
2nd  Individual pursuit
 6th Paris–Roubaix Juniors
2012
 UEC European Under-23 Track Championships
1st  Team pursuit
3rd  Points race
 3rd Time trial, National Under-23 Road Championships
2013
 1st  Team pursuit, 2012–13 UCI Track Cycling World Cup, Aguascalientes
 2nd Overall Baltic Chain Tour
1st Young rider classification
 3rd  Madison, UEC European Under-23 Track Championships
2014
 1st  Road race, National Under-23 Road Championships
2015
 1st Overall Tour de Serbie
1st Points classification
1st Stages 1, 2 & 4
 1st Stage 4 Tour of Qinghai Lake
 2nd Overall Grand Prix of Sochi
1st  Points classification
1st Stages 2 & 3
 2nd Grand Prix of Moscow
 4th Overall Five Rings of Moscow
 4th Overall Tour of Małopolska
 4th Moscow Cup
 5th Maykop–Ulyap–Maykop
 6th Overall Tour of Kuban
1st Stage 1
 6th Grand Prix of Sochi Mayor
 8th Tour of Almaty
2016
 6th Handzame Classic
2017
 1st Stage 4 Okolo Slovenska
 5th Rad am Ring

Grand Tour general classification results timeline

References

External links

1992 births
Living people
Russian male cyclists
Russian track cyclists